Joseph Wilkins (1634-1716) was Dean of Clogher from 1682 until his death.

Wilkins was educated at Trinity College, Dublin.  He was elected Fellow in 1661 and Vice Provost in 1670. He was Rector of Lisburn from 1672 until his death.

Notes

Deans of Clogher
18th-century Irish Anglican priests
17th-century Irish Anglican priests
Alumni of Trinity College, Cambridge